Mahmoud Fathi (born May 7, 1988) is an Egyptian professional footballer who currently plays as a defensive midfielder for the Egyptian club El Raja SC. In August 2015, Fathi signed a 3-year 700,000 EGP contract for Smouha SC coming from Enppi, 4 months later he was loaned to El Dakhleya after the manager Moamen Soliman declared that he doesn't need the player.

References

External links
 

1988 births
Living people
El Raja SC players
Egyptian footballers
Association football midfielders
Smouha SC players
El Dakhleya SC players
Al Ittihad Alexandria Club players